Huotari is a Finnish surname. Notable people with the surname include:

Anton Huotari (1881–1931), Finnish journalist and politician
Kalevi Huotari (1924–1975), Finnish politician
Anne Huotari (born 1959), Finnish politician
Satu Huotari (born 1967), Finnish ice hockey player

Finnish-language surnames